It's a Bare, Bare World! is a 1963 British naturist film.

References

External links
[https://www.imdb.com/title/tt0222046/ It's a Bare, Bare World!] at IMDb

British short films
1963 films
Nudity in film
1960s English-language films